Eli Noyes (born October 18, 1942 in Amherst, Massachusetts) is an American animator most noted for his stop animation work using clay and sand.

Early life
Eliot Fette Noyes, Jr. was born the son of noted "Harvard Five" architect Eliot Noyes and his wife, interior designer Molly Duncan Weed Noyes. He is the brother of Fred Noyes. He graduated from Harvard University in 1964.

Career
In 1964, Noyes created the animated film Clay or Origin of the Species  which was nominated for the Academy Award for Best Animated Short Film.
The film is considered one of the earliest examples of clay stop-animation and is cited by Wallace and Gromit creators, Peter Lord and David Sproxton as a large influence on their work.

Noyes is also noted for his creation of the Sand Alphabet for  Sesame Street and the Nickelodeon children's television series, Eureeka's Castle. In 2003, Noyes cofounded the animation production studio Alligator Planet with Ralph Guggenheim and Alan Buder. Noyes directed animation sequences for two films which were shortlisted for the 2009 Academy Award for Best Documentary Feature,  Under Our Skin and  The Most Dangerous Man in America, a final nominee.

Filmography
 Clay (or the Origin of Species) (1964) 
 Alphabet (1966)
 The Hat (1969)
 He-Man and She-Bar (1972)
 Worm Dances (1973)
 Sesame Street ("Sand Letters" shorts) (1974–1991) (TV series)
 Sandman (1975) (TV special)  
 Bad Dog (1976)
 Peanut Butter & Jelly (1976)
 Special Delivery (show open) (1980) (TV series)
 MTV (network ID's) (1981–1983) (TV series)
 Braingames (1983–1985) (TV series)
 Nickelodeon (network ID's) (1985–1989) (TV series)
 Nick at Nite (launch ID's) (1986) (TV series)
 The Fable of He and She (1988)
 Eureeka's Castle (1989–1994) (TV series)
 Liquid Television (1991–1994) (TV series)
 Cheerios (commercial) (1991) (TV)
 Adventures in Wonderland (main title) (1992) (TV series)
 Burger King (commercial) (1992) (TV)
 CIGNA (commercial) (1992) (TV)
 Bubble Yum (commercial) (1994) (TV)

References

External links
 Alligator Planet
 
 
 Clay or The Origin of Species on filmmaker's official YouTube channel
 Sandman on Vimeo

1942 births
Living people
American animators
American animated film directors
American animated film producers
Stop motion animators
Clay animators
American film producers
American film directors
English-language film directors
Place of birth missing (living people)
Harvard University alumni